Konstantin Ivanovich Beskov (18 November 1920 – 6 May 2006) was a Soviet/Russian footballer and coach.

Beskov was born in Moscow. He played for Dynamo Moscow as forward, scoring 126 goals, and after finishing his playing career he became a successful manager who coached Dynamo and their rivals Spartak.

He also managed the USSR at the finals of Euro 64 and the 1982 World Cup.

Sporting honours

As player 
Dynamo Moscow
Soviet Top League (2): 1945, 1949
Soviet Cup (1): 1953

As manager 
Spartak Moscow
Soviet Top League (2): 1979, 1987
USSR Federation Cup (1): 1987
Soviet First League (1): 1977
European Cup: Quarterfinalist 1981
UEFA Cup: Quarterfinalist 1984

Dynamo Moscow
Soviet Cup (2): 1967, 1970
Russian Cup (1): 1995
European Cup Winners' Cup: Runner-up 1972

Soviet Union
UEFA European Championship: Runner-up 1964
Summer Olympic Games Bronze Medal: 1980

Moscow XI
Spartakiad of Peoples of the USSR (1): 1979

Honours and awards
 Order of Merit for the Fatherland, 2nd class and 3rd class
 Order of Lenin
 Order of the Patriotic War, 2nd class
 Order of Friendship of Peoples
 Order of the Badge of Honour, twice (incl. 1957)
 Jubilee Medal "In Commemoration of the 100th Anniversary since the Birth of Vladimir Il'ich Lenin"
 Medal "For Valiant Labour in the Great Patriotic War 1941-1945"
 Jubilee Medal "Twenty Years of Victory in the Great Patriotic War 1941-1945"
 Jubilee Medal "Thirty Years of Victory in the Great Patriotic War 1941-1945"
 Medal "In Commemoration of the 850th Anniversary of Moscow"

References

External links

  Konstantin Beskov dies 

Order of Merit for the Fatherland, 2nd class and 3rd class

1920 births
2006 deaths
Footballers from Moscow
FC Dynamo Moscow players
Soviet footballers
Soviet Top League players
Footballers at the 1952 Summer Olympics
Olympic footballers of the Soviet Union
Soviet football managers
Russian football managers
1964 European Nations' Cup managers
1982 FIFA World Cup managers
Soviet Union international footballers
FC Torpedo Moscow managers
PFC CSKA Moscow managers
FC Zorya Luhansk managers
FC Lokomotiv Moscow managers
FC Dynamo Moscow managers
FC Spartak Moscow managers
FC Asmaral Moscow managers
Russian Premier League managers
Soviet Union national football team managers
Recipients of the Order "For Merit to the Fatherland", 2nd class
Recipients of the Order of Friendship of Peoples
Merited Coaches of the Soviet Union
Burials at Vagankovo Cemetery
Communist Party of the Soviet Union members
Recipients of the Order of Lenin
Recipients of the Order "For Merit to the Fatherland", 3rd class
Association football forwards